The Poyang Lake Dam, referred to as the Poyang Lake Water Conservancy Project, is dam proposed to maintain water levels at Poyang Lake in Jiangxi Province, China. The lake is China's largest freshwater resource but has significantly decreased in size during the 21st century due to heavy damming, drought and dredging. Construction of the dam can also cause severe damages on remnant population of finless porpoises.

References

Dams in China
Proposed dams